Lamine Sy (born 10 August 2002) is a French professional footballer who plays as a right-back for SM Caen.

Club career 
Lamine Sy joined the Stade Malherbe de Caen academy in 2014 from the Olympique of les Mureaux, starting to play with the Norman team reserve in National 3 during the 2019–20 season.

Playing only one game that season and during the following one in National 2, he eventually established himself as a regular starter with the reserve in 2021–22 under Fabrice Vandeputte management, earning his first calls to the first team in February 2022.

He made his professional debut for SM Caen on the 5 February 2022, replacing the right-back Hugo Vandermersch during a 1–1 away Ligue 2 away draw against AS Nancy.

Style of play 
First playing as a midfielder, Sy was moved to the right-back position by Vandeputte where he became a starter in the reserve and played in Caen first team. He is described as a fast, powerful and agile footballer, able to make good use of his technical abilities to be decisive in the attacking phases.

Personal life 
Having grew up in Île-de-France, Lamine Sy is the younger brother of Harouna Sy, who also plays professionally as a fullback, at Amiens.

References

External links

SM Caen profile

2002 births
Living people
Footballers from Yvelines
French footballers
French sportspeople of Mauritanian descent
Association football midfielders
Stade Malherbe Caen players
Ligue 2 players